Trechus amicorum is a species of ground beetle in the subfamily Trechinae. It was described by P. Moravec & Wrase in 1998.

References

amicorum
Beetles described in 1998